Vogrsko  is a settlement in the lower Vipava Valley in the Municipality of Renče–Vogrsko in the Littoral region of Slovenia.

The parish church in the settlement is dedicated to Saint Justus and belongs to the Diocese of Koper.

References

External links
Vogrsko on Geopedia

Populated places in the Municipality of Renče-Vogrsko